CD9 is a gene encoding a protein that is a member of the transmembrane 4 superfamily also known as the tetraspanin family. It is a cell surface glycoprotein that consists of four transmembrane regions and has two extracellular loops that contain disulfide bonds which are conserved throughout the tetraspanin family. Also containing distinct palmitoylation sites that allows CD9 to interact with lipids and other proteins.

Function 
Tetraspanin proteins are involved in a multitude of biological processes such as adhesion, motility, membrane fusion, signaling and protein trafficking. Tetraspanins play a role in many biological processes because of their ability to interact with many different proteins including interactions between each other. Their distinct palmitoylation sites allow them to organize on the membrane into tetraspanin-enriched microdomains (TEM). These TEMs are thought to play a role in many cellular processes including exosome biogenesis. CD9 is commonly used as a marker for exosomes as it is contained on their surface.

However, in some cases CD9 plays a larger role in the ability of exosomes to be more or less pathogenic. Shown in HIV-1 infection, exosomes are able to enhance HIV-1 entry through tetraspanin CD9 and CD81. However, expression of CD9 on the cellular membrane seems to decrease the viral entry of HIV-1.

CD9 has a diverse role in cellular processes as it has also been shown to trigger platelet activation and aggregation. It forms a alphaIIbbeta3-CD9-CD63 complex on the surface of platelets that interacts directly with other cells such as neutrophils which may assist in immune response. In addition, the protein appears to promote muscle cell fusion and support myotube maintenance. Also, playing a key role in egg-sperm fusion during mammalian fertilization. While oocytes are ovulated, CD9-deficient oocytes do not properly fuse with sperm upon fertilization. CD9 is located in the microvillar membrane of the oocytes and also appears to intervene in maintaining the normal shape of oocyte microvilli.

CD9 can also modulate cell adhesion and migration. This function makes CD9 of interest when studying cancer and cancer metastasis. However, it seems CD9 has a varying role in different types of cancers. Studies showed that CD9 expression levels have an inverse correlation to metastatic potential or patient survival. The over expression of CD9 was shown to decrease metastasis in certain types of melanoma, breast, lung, pancreas and colon carcinomas. However in other studies, CD9 has been shown to increase migration or be highly expressed in metastatic cancers in various cell lines such as lung cancer, scirrhous-type gastric cancer, hepatocellular carcinoma, acute lymphoblastic leukemia, and breast cancer. Suggesting based on the cancer CD9 can be a tumor suppressor or promotor.  It has also been suggested that CD9 has an effect on the ability for cancer cells to develop chemoresistance.

Additionally, CD9 has been shown to block adhesion of Staphylococcus aureus to wounds. The adhesion is essential for infection of the wound. This suggests that CD9 could be of possible use to as treatment for skin infection by Staphylococcus aureus.

Interactions 

CD9 has been shown to interact with:

 CD117, 
 CD29 
 CD46, 
 CD49c,
 CD81, 
 PTGFRN, 
 TSPAN4. 
 CD63  
 ADAM17   
 CD81

See also 
 Tetraspanin
 Myogenesis
 Fertilisation

References

Further reading 

 
 
 
 
 
 
 
 
 
 
 
 
 
 
 
 Cho, J.H., Kim, E., Son, Y. et al. (2020). CD9 induces cellular senescence and aggravates atherosclerotic plaque formation. Cell Death & Differentiation   https://doi.org/10.1038/s41418-020-0537-9

External links